is a railway station on the Karatsu Line operated by JR Kyushu located in Karatsu, Saga Prefecture, Japan.

Lines

Station layout 
The station consists of two side platforms serving two tracks. Two sidings branch off the main tracks. The station building is of timber construction and is unstaffed, serving only as a waiting room. Access to the opposite side platform is by means of a footbridge.

Adjacent stations

History 
On 13 June 1899, the track was extended to Kyūragi which became the new eastern terminus. On 25 December 1899, Kyūragi became a through-station when the track was extended further east to Azamibaru (now ). On 23 February 1902, the company, now renamed the Karatsu Railway, merged with the Kyushu Railway. On 1 November 1903, the station was renamed Iwaya. When the Kyushu Railway was nationalized on 1 July 1907, Japanese Government Railways (JGR) took over control of the station. On 12 October 1909, the line which served the station was designated the Karatsu Line. With the privatization of Japanese National Railways (JNR), the successor of JGR, on 1 April 1987, control of the station passed to JR Kyushu.

Passenger statistics
In fiscal 2016, the station was used by an average of 328 passengers daily (boarding passengers only), and it ranked 298th among the busiest stations of JR Kyushu.

Environs
National Route 203
Karatsu City Hall Kyūragi Branch
Saga Prefectural Kyūragi High School
Kyūragi Post office

References

External links
Kyūragi Station (JR Kyushu)

Railway stations in Saga Prefecture
Stations of Kyushu Railway Company
Karatsu Line
Railway stations in Japan opened in 1899